Drôle de parcours is the fifth studio album by French rapper La Fouine. It was released on 4 February 2013 by his record label Banlieue Sale and Jive Records, and peaked at number 1 on the French Albums Chart.

Background
After the release of his fourth studio album La Fouine vs. Laouni on 14 February 2011, La Fouine released the mixtape Capitale du crime, Vol. 3 on 28 November the same year, that featured artists such as T-Pain, Orelsan, Mister You, Nessbeal, Alonzo or even Amel Bent and Corneille, who are both featured in Drôle de parcours. Corneille also released the single "Des pères, des hommes et des frères" with La Fouine the same year.

In March 2012, La Fouine announced that he was working on a fifth studio album, and was working with Amel Bent in the studio. In September 2012, he revealed February 2013 as the release month for the album, as well as its title.

Singles
 "J'avais pas les mots" was released as the album's lead single on 19 November 2012. It peaked at number 16 on the French Singles Chart.

Critical reception

François Alvarez of Music Story called Drôle de parcours an album that is "torn between legitimacy and smiles on the radio, and that may ultimately leave everyone hungry". He emphasizes, "an even disc where the tracks close to variety especially have the quality of being easily programmable on radio". He specifies that La Fouine "doesn't hide himself and fully varies his rap, while slipping some harder tracks to show that his exile in Florida did not completely soften him."

Commercial performance
Drôle de parcours sold more than 100,000 copies and spent a total of 55 weeks in the French Albums Charts, and was later certified platinum in France.

Track listing

Notes
 The name "Mouhid" refers to Laouni Mouhid. Fatima Mouhid and Hakim Mouhid are referred to by their full names.

Personnel
Credits for Drôle de parcours adapted from Discogs.

 Luca Presti – Producer, keyboard, drum programming
 Bone Collector – Producer
 Christian "Crada" Kalla – Producer
 DikC – Producer, keyboard, drum programming
 DJ No Name – Producer, keyboard, drum programming
 E-Rise & Doc Ness – Producer
 Gun Roulett – Producer, keyboard, drum programming
 K-sba – Producer
 Kore – Producer
 La Fouine  – Primary artist
 Médeline – Producer
 Oneshot – Producer, keyboard, drum programming
 Prinzly – Producer, keyboard, drum programming
 Rodney Jerkins – Producer
 Seycko – Producer
 Son Ha – Piano
 Sonny Alves – Producer, keyboard, drum programming

Charts

Weekly charts

Year-end charts

References

2013 albums
La Fouine albums
French-language albums
Jive Records albums